Alawalpur is a town and a municipal council in Jalandhar district in the state of Punjab, India. Alawalpur is named after Alawal Khan, a Pathan who ruled the area during the time of Maharajah Ranjit Singh. Sardar Himmat Singh Jallewalia a Baraut Jat Sardar, a general in Ranjit Singh's army, later conquered Alawalpur. His descendants still live in a fort located at the center of the city.

History
Rajput Thikka of Alawalpur has been residence of Jat Sikh families for centuries. Alawalpur Bans Jat families repelled Pathan invaders after which prosperity thrived for centuries.

Geography
It has an average elevation of 232 metres (761 feet).It is located on the Kartarpur Adampur road. Alawalpur has a reasonably good market providing all items of daily use to the people living nearby. Villages surrounding Alawalpur include Doltpur, Dhogri, Sikandarpur, Sarmastpur, Sanghwal, Kishangarh and several more. DAV University has been recently established in the village Sarmastpur, very close to Alawalpur. This institute is helping the local people in getting the higher education and  providing career opportunities. People like Er. Sumit Arora (Sanghwal), Satnam Badhan (Sanghwal) are doing best efforts to make their village best among other villages.

Demographics
 India census, Alawalpur had a population of 7,172. Males constitute 52% of the population and females 48%. Alawalpur has an average literacy rate of 73%, higher than the national average of 59.5%; with 55% of the males and 45% of females literate. 12% of the population is under 6 years of age.

References

Cities and towns in Jalandhar district